DHEC may refer to:

 DHEC, South Carolina Department of Health and Environmental Control
 Dihydroergocryptine